Kalushi is a 2016 South African film about Solomon Kalushi Mahlangu, a nineteen-year-old hawker from the streets of Mamelodi, a township outside Pretoria in South Africa. He was born in Pretoria on 10 July in 1956, the second son of Martha Mahlangu. His father left him in 1962, and from then on only saw him infrequently. His mother was a domestic worker and took sole responsibility for his upbringing. The film is based on a true story.

Plot 
Kalushi is brutally beaten by the police. He goes into exile following the 1976 Soweto uprisings to join the liberation movement.  He returns from military training in Angola. En route to their mission, his friend and comrade, Mondy, loses control and shoots two innocent people on Goch Street in Johannesburg. Mondy is severely beaten and tortured; Kalushi is forced to stand trial under the common purpose doctrine.

The state seeks the highest punishment from the court, death by hanging. Kalushi has his back against the wall and uses the courtroom as a final battlefield. His sacrifice immortalises him into a hero of the struggle and a national icon of the youth joining Umkhonto we Sizwe.

Cast

References

External links 
 

2016 films
Apartheid films
South African drama films
City of Tshwane Metropolitan Municipality